Ewbank is a brand of mechanical carpet sweepers sold in the United Kingdom since the 19th century. Originally owned by Entwisle and Kenyon Ltd, it is now owned by Earlex Ltd.

History
Founded in Accrington, Lancashire, the company has its origins in an 1864 company founded by John Ramsbottom and George Hacking, which made water meters. They were joined by John Haworth, James Entwisle, and James Kenyon, and when the founders retired the company was renamed Entwisle and Kenyon Limited.

Entwisle & Kenyon started making washing machines around 1875, and also manufactured mangles. While one of the company's representatives, Richard Walton Kenyon, was in the United States in 1882 to source wooden blocks for mangles, he visited a carpet sweeper factory in Chicago, and saw the potential for the product, which was already popular in the US, in the UK. Kenyon designed the first Ewbank branded carpet sweeper, which went on sale in 1889. It became the most popular product of its type in Britain, where carpet sweeping became known as "ewbanking". The 'Ewbank' name came from the Ewbank area of Accrington, where the factory was located.

Sweepers were produced in several models including 'Standard', 'Parlour Queen', and even miniature versions for children.

Ewbank became a major manufacturer of floor-care products after World War II, including carpet shampooers, selling both in the UK and via export internationally. Originally using metal casing, the sweepers were made from Novodur in the mid-1970s.

By the mid-1970s Ewbank was owned by Prestige. In 2003, the company was purchased by Earlex Ltd.

In November 2013 the company became independent again and has since opened subsidiary companies in the US and Hong Kong. The company still produces carpet sweepers and shampooers but has now moved into cordless vacuum cleaners, 2 in 1 vacuum cleaners, steam cleaners, UVC bed cleaners and the number one selling product now is their floor polisher/scrubber.

References

External links

Companies established in 1864
Home appliance manufacturers of the United Kingdom
Vacuum cleaner manufacturers
British brands
Companies based in Surrey
Godalming